Raimar von Hase (born 12 March 1948) is a Namibian farmer.

Career
Raimar von Hase began farming in 1975. He previously owned land in the Hardap Region near Uhlenhorst, where he bred Karakul sheep, and other animal husbandry. This land was sold to the Namibian government in 2013. von Hase was the leader of the Namibia Agricultural Union, which represents Namibia's farmers nationally, from 2004 to 2012. He replaced Jan de Wet, who had previously served since 1994. As leader of the NAU, von Hase adopted a conciliatory approach to national land reform, welcoming constitutional reforms. von Hase has also served as an honorary financial advisor to Namibian President Hage Geingob.

References

1948 births
Living people
Namibian farmers
White Namibian people
Namibian people of German descent
People from Hardap Region